John Daniel "Danny" Tate (born November 10, 1955) is an American musician, songwriter, composer, producer, and former Virgin Records recording artist, best known for penning songs covered by Jeff Healey, Kenny Wayne Shepherd, Lynyrd Skynyrd, Tim McGraw, The Oak Ridge Boys, The Smithereens, Diesel, Nelson, David Lee Murphy, Billy Ray Cyrus, Doro Pesch, The Fabulous Thunderbirds, Patti LaBelle, Walk the West, Cactus Brothers, Carla Olson, Danny Wilde and many others.

Most notably, Tate won the NSAI Rock Song of the Year award for 1998, 1999 and 2000. His start came when he co-wrote the 1983 multi-platinum hit, "Affair of the Heart", by Rick Springfield. He released three solo albums, Danny Tate Charisma/Virgin (1992), Nobody's Perfect Charisma/Virgin (1995), and Destination X Noville Records (2005), meeting limited success and continued his career writing songs, composing for television shows, (Extra!, Entertainment Tonight, The Tyra Banks Show, The Ellen DeGeneres Show) and contributing to the film soundtracks of 3000 Miles to Graceland, Boys Don't Cry, and How to Make an American Quilt.

Associated acts
David Lee Murphy, The Warren Brothers, Doro Pesch, Tim McGraw, Russ Taff, Kenny Wayne Shepherd, The Smithereens, Rick Springfield, The Oak Ridge Boys, Patti LaBelle, Jeff Healey, Billy Ray Cyrus, Lynyrd Skynyrd, Travis Tritt, Dwight Yoakam, Diesel, Jack Casady, Nelson, Béla Fleck, The Rembrandts, Danny Johnson, John Brannen, and John Cowan.

Early life
John Daniel Tate was born on November 10, 1955 to David Munroe Tate Jr. and Hazel Ella Tate in Beaumont, Texas. At 6 years old, Tate's family moved to Camden, Arkansas where his father, a music minister, accepted a position at a new church. There, he spent his formative years absorbing the musical and religious influences of a classic small town setting. In 1974, Tate left home to attend college, where he studied under the renowned composer and conductor, William Francis McBeth. Tate graduated Who's Who in American Colleges and Universities and is a member of Mensa. In 1989 Governor Bill Clinton appointed Tate "Arkansas Traveler"-Ambassador of Good Will.

Career
After graduating with a Bachelor of Music in Music Theory and Composition in 1978, Tate found work as a solo performer for the High School Assembly Service out of Chicago, Illinois. Touring continuously on a grueling schedule, Tate performed a combination of popular radio hits, his own songs, and told stories in a one-man show designed for High School students. From 1978 to 1980, Tate performed 600 shows in 3 semesters and had the most successful ratings and sales in the Service's 50-year history.

Later in 1980, Tate moved to Nashville with intentions of making a name for himself in the music industry. His big break came when a friend cornered Rick Springfield in a club restroom and handed him a cassette tape of Tate's song "Superman" which immediately caught Springfield's ear. Tate wrote off the exchange as an impossible probability until he received a phone call from Springfield's manager, who requested the use of a substantial and extremely infectious part of the song. After a melding of minds, the writers came up with the co-written song which morphed into the runaway hit, Affair of the Heart. Springfield's recording of the song peaked at #9 on Billboard charts, the album Living in Oz went platinum, and the song was nominated for a Grammy (losing to Michael Jackson's Beat It).

Solo career
Riding on his success, Tate moved to Los Angeles where he felt his talents would be more profitable as a pop/rock songwriter. He then embarked on a solo career releasing Danny Tate (1992), Nobody’s Perfect (1995) followed up with the "Dreamin'" tour featuring Danny Johnson formerly with Rick Derringer, Rod Stewart and the Troggs on guitar, and Destination X (2005). In 2005, Tate also released a Christmas Single entitled, "Wonder what Jesus thinks about Christmas," offering a clever and unexpected examination of the Christmas holiday.

Movie credits
How to Make an American Quilt (1995)
Boys Don't Cry (1999)
3000 Miles to Graceland (2001)
The Black Dove (not yet released)

Television credits
Enjoying uncommon success as a songwriter in a variety of musical genres, spanning pop, rock, country, alternative, heavy metal, and blues, Tate expanded his resume' to include musical cues and underscore for television shows. His compositions have been featured on Entertainment Tonight, Extra!, TMZ, Celebrity Justice, The Insider, The Ellen DeGeneres Show, The Tyra Banks Show, The Bachelor, As the World Turns, Guiding Light, and Judge Mathis.

Awards
NSAI Rock Song of the Year 1998, 1999, 2000
BMI #1 Awards 
Multiple Platinum and Gold Records

“Only an artist of rare talent, intelligence, and instinct could achieve the kind of lasting success that Tate has enjoyed"—Vincent Jeffries (VH1.com)

References

External links
 http://www.allmusic.com/artist/tate-p22061
 https://www.amazon.com/Danny-Tate/e/B000APXS1I
 http://www.vh1.com/artists/az/tate_danny/artist.jhtml

1955 births
People from Beaumont, Texas
Living people
Mensans
Songwriters from Texas